

BMC is a Colombian Mercantil Exchange.

Currently, BMC is a mixed capital company governed by private law and subject to supervision by the Superintendencia Financiera de Colombia (Financial Supervision Body of Colombia). It shares are traded on the Bolsa de Valores de Colombia (Colombian Stock Exchange).

It is headquartered in Bogotá and has 5 regional offices located in Ibagué, Barranquilla, Cali, Medellín and Manizales.

References 

Economy of Colombia
Companies listed on the Colombia Stock Exchange
Commodity exchanges